The 2022 Rugby Europe Women's Sevens Conference was held in Belgrade from 4 to 5 June 2022. The tournament is played in two phases, group stage and knockout for placement.

Participating nations

Tournament

Group stage 
All times in Central European Summer Time (UTC+02:00)

Pool A

Pool B

Pool C

Knockout stage

Cup

5th Place

9th Place

Standings

External links 
Conference page

References 

2022
2022 rugby sevens competitions
2022 in Serbian sport
June 2022 sports events in Serbia